Malcolm Currie (5 February 1932 – 1996) was a Scottish professional footballer who played as a full back.

Career
Born in Rutherglen, Currie began his career with hometown club Rutherglen Glencairn, before moving to English league side Bradford City in 1956. Currie made 136 league appearances for Bradford, before leaving in 1961 to join non-league side Nelson.

External links
 

1932 births
1996 deaths
Sportspeople from Rutherglen
Scottish footballers
Bradford City A.F.C. players
Nelson F.C. players
Rutherglen Glencairn F.C. players
English Football League players
Association football fullbacks
Footballers from South Lanarkshire